Jimmy Crampton (born 1949) is an Irish retired hurler who played as a right wing-back for the Tipperary senior team.

Born in Roscrea, County Tipperary, Crampton first arrived on the inter-county scene at the age of twenty when he first linked up with the Tipperary under-21 football team. He joined the senior hurling panel during the 1972 championship. Crampton went on to enjoy a brief career with Tipperary.

At club level Crampton is a one-time All-Ireland medallist with Roscrea. In addition to this he also won two Munster medals and six championship medals.

Honours

Player

Roscrea
All-Ireland Senior Club Hurling Championship (1): 1971
Munster Senior Club Hurling Championship (2): 1969, 1970
Tipperary Senior Hurling Championship (6): 1968, 1969, 1970, 1972, 1973, 1980

References

1949 births
Living people
Roscrea hurlers
Tipperary inter-county hurlers
Tipperary inter-county Gaelic footballers